M was an English new wave and synthpop music project from London, England, led by English musician Robin Scott in the late 1970s and early 1980s. M is most known for the 1979 hit "Pop Muzik", which reached number two in the UK Singles Chart in May 1979, and number one in the U.S. Billboard Hot 100 chart on 3 November 1979. Musicians who contributed to M at one time or another included Wally Badarou, Mark King, Phil Gould and Gary Barnacle of Level 42.

Career
Scott first used the pseudonym M in 1978, when he released the single "Moderne Man". His next single, "Pop Muzik," featured Scott's brother Julian on bass, his wife Brigit Novik on backing vocals, and Wally Badarou on keyboards. The album New York–London–Paris–Munich was released in 1979.

M had three other singles that achieved a chart entry in the UK, "Moonlight and Muzak" (No. 33 in December 1979), "That's the Way the Money Goes" (No. 45 in March 1980) and "Official Secrets" (No. 64 in November 1980). M released three studio albums throughout their career: New York • London • Paris • Munich in 1979, The Official Secrets Act in 1980, and Famous Last Words in 1982, which was never released in the UK. A fourth album, Robin Scott with Shikisha, was recorded in 1984 but was not released until 1998.

M's first single "Moderne Man" was later remixed with "Satisfy Your Lust", the B-side of "That's the Way the Money Goes", and appeared as a medley on their album New York • London • Paris • Munich.  The original single releases appeared on the 1997 CD re-release. A remixed version of "Pop Muzik" was played before each concert of U2's PopMart Tour.

Personnel

Full Members
 Robin Scott – vocals, guitar, synthesizer, piano, keyboards

Session Members
 Brigit Novik Vinchon – vocals (1978–1982)
 Wally Badarou – keyboards, synthesizers, sequencer (1978–1984)
 Julian Scott – bass (1978–1982)
 Philip Gould – drums, percussion (1978–1980)
 Gary Barnacle – saxophone, flute (1978–1982)
 David Bowie – handclaps (1978)
 David Vorhaus – synthesizer (1980)
 Mark King – guitar, drums, bass (1980–1982)
 Paddy Keenan – Uilleann pipes (1980)
 Marlisse & Steve – backing vocals (1982)
 Mary Bird – backing vocals (1982)
 Andy Gill – guitar (1982)
 Gordon Huntley – guitar (1982)
 Jamie West – guitar (1982)
 Nick Plytas – organ, moog bass, piano, backing vocals (1982)
 Barry Adamson – bass (1982)
 Tony Levin – bass (1982)
 Andy Anderson – drums (1982)
 Sergio Castillo – drums (1982)
 Yukihiro Takahashi – drums (1982)
 John Lewis – synthesizer, sequencer (1982)
 Thomas Dolby – synthesizer, sequencer (1982)
 Sammy Smile – bass (1984)
 Columbo Lamu – brass (1984)
 Tabu Frantal – guitar (1984)
 Mose Fan Fan – guitar (1984)
 Shikisha – vocals (1984)
 Betty Boo Hlela
 Doreen Webster
 Julia Muntu Mathunjwa

Discography

Albums

Studio albums

† Recorded in 1984 – not released until 1998 and credited to Robin Scott & Shikisha.

Compilation albums
 Pop Muzik – The Very Best of M (1996, Music Collection International)
 Pop Muzik (1997, Collectables Records) Reissue of the US version of New York • London • Paris • Munich.
 '''M' The History – Pop Muzik The 25th Anniversary (2004, Union Square Music)
 Pop Muzik – 30th Anniversary Remixes (2009, Echo Beach) Remix album featuring 13 remixes of "Pop Muzik".

Singles

‡ – billed as Robin Scott

See also
List of new wave artists and bands
List of artists who reached number one in the United States
List of artists who reached number one on the Australian singles chart
List of synthpop artists
List of 1970s one-hit wonders in the United States

References

External links
 

English new wave musical groups
British synth-pop new wave groups
Sire Records artists
MCA Records artists
Stiff Records artists
Warner Records artists
English pop music groups
Musical groups from London
Musical groups established in 1979
Musical groups disestablished in 1981